Ibolya  Weiszné Mehlmann (born 4 November 1981) is a former Hungarian handball player who played for the Hungarian national team.

Career

Mehlmann started her professional career in Győri ETO KC, and first got into the spotlight when she proved her prolific goalscoring skills and led the Hungarian junior national team to win the silver medal on the  2001 Junior World Championship.

It gave a big boost to her career and soon became the first choice right back in her club. She debuted in the Hungarian national team as well, and was member of the World Championship silver and bronze medallist, and the European Championship bronze medallist team. She was also present on the 2004 Summer Olympics.

In the 2006 European Championship she was the top goalscorer of the Hungarian team with 37 goals and was selected for the All-Star team. In the same year she switched to Aalborg DH.

In 2008, when it was made official that Mehlmann is in delicate condition, the sides terminated the contract with immediate effect. She gave birth to a boy, Olivér, on 28 December 2008.

Mehlmann resumed training in early 2010 and joined Hungarian second division team VKLSE Győr. At the end of the season she was signed by Veszprém Barabás KC.

In August 2011, still under contract with Veszprém, Mehlmann travelled to Ljlubljana with the permission of her club to participate on a trial by RK Krim Ljubljana. She impressed the Slovenian club's staff who offered her a one-year contract, which Mehlmann accepted and moved to Krim on 16 August 2011. Her last club on professional level was Hypo Niederösterreich.

Achievements

Club
Nemzeti Bajnokság I:
Winner: 2005
Silver Medallist: 2000, 2004
Bronze Medallist: 2001, 2002, 2003, 2006
Magyar Kupa:
Winner: 2005
Damehåndboldligaen:
Bronze Medallist: 2007
EHF Cup:
Finalist: 2002, 2004, 2005

International
Junior World Championship:
Silver Medallist: 2001
World Championship:
Silver Medallist: 2003
Bronze Medallist: 2005
European Championship:
Bronze Medallist: 2004

Individual awards
 All-Star Right Back of the European Championship: 2006

References

External links
 Ibolya Mehlmann career statistics on Worldhandball.com

1981 births
Living people
Hungarian female handball players
Sportspeople from Pécs
Handball players at the 2004 Summer Olympics
Olympic handball players of Hungary
Expatriate handball players
Hungarian expatriates in Denmark
Hungarian expatriates in Slovenia
Győri Audi ETO KC players